Rhodophaea is a genus of moth of the family Pyralidae described by Achille Guenée in 1845. It is found in most of Europe and in India.

Species
Rhodophaea albirenalis Hampson, 1908 (India)
Rhodophaea nigralbella Hampson, 1908 (India)
Rhodophaea formosa (Haworth, 1811) (Europe, Russian Far East)
Rhodophaea exotica (Inoue, 1959) (Japan, Russian Far East)

References

External links

 waarneming.nl 
 Lepidoptera of Belgium
 Pempelia formosa on UKMoths

Phycitinae
Moths of Japan
Insects of Turkey
Pyralidae genera